Touch the Sky is the 10th album by American singer-songwriter Carole King, released in 1979.

Track listing
All songs by Carole King. 
"Time Gone By" 4:13
"Move Lightly" 4:58
"Dreamlike I Wander" 3:50
"Walk With Me" 2:52
"Good Mountain People" 3:23
"You Still Want Her" 4:39
"Passing of the Days" 2:48
"Crazy" 4:00
"Eagle" 4:35
"Seeing Red" 3:50

Personnel
Carole King – lead vocals, background vocals, guitar, piano
Reese Wynans – piano, keyboards
Dave Perkins – guitar, background vocals
Ron Cobb – bass, saxophone, flute, background vocals
Bobby Rambo – guitar, background vocals
Mark Hallman – guitar, mandolin, synthesizer, background vocals
Leo LeBlanc – pedal steel guitar, background vocals
Fred Krc – drums, percussion, background vocals
Miguel Rivera – congas, percussion
Tomas Ramirez – saxophone, flute, recorder, background vocals
Richard Hardy – saxophone

Production notes
Produced by Carole King and Mark Hallman
Engineered by Chet Himes
Mastered by Bernie Grundman
Jim McGuire – photography
James Flournoy/Wonder Graphics – art direction, design

Chart positions

External links
Carole King discography.

References

1979 albums
Carole King albums
Capitol Records albums
Albums with cover art by James Flournoy Holmes